Daniel Edward Winfree (born February 1953) is an American lawyer who served as chief justice of the Alaska Supreme Court from 2021 to 2023. He was appointed to the Alaska Supreme Court by Governor Sarah Palin in 2008. He was sworn in on February 13, 2008.

Education 

Winfree received a Bachelor of Science in finance from the University of Oregon in 1977, a Master of Business Administration from the Haas School of Business and Juris Doctor from UC Berkeley School of Law both in 1981.

Alaska Supreme Court 

He was appointed to the court in 2008 by Republican Governor Sarah Palin to succeed former Associate Justice Alex Bryner. He retired from the court in February 2023.

References

External links

 http://votesmart.org/candidate/biography/110972/daniel-winfree#

1953 births
21st-century American judges
Chief Justices of the Alaska Supreme Court
Haas School of Business alumni
Justices of the Alaska Supreme Court
Lawyers from Fairbanks, Alaska
Living people
Politicians from Fairbanks, Alaska
UC Berkeley School of Law alumni
University of Oregon alumni